Andrew O'Dell (born 2 January 1963) is an English former footballer who played as a midfielder in the Football League for Grimsby Town – where he was Young Player of the Year in 1981 – Rotherham United, Torquay United and Darlington. He also played in non-league football for Gainsborough Trinity and North Ferriby United.

He then moved to Victoria, Australia, where he played for clubs including Heidelberg United, Fawkner, Morwell Falcons, North Perth Croatia, Croydon City and Mitcham United.

After his playing career ended, he remained in Australia and took up coaching. He was appointed senior coach of Victorian State League Division 1 club Preston Lions in 2014.

References

1963 births
Living people
Footballers from Kingston upon Hull
English footballers
Association football midfielders
Grimsby Town F.C. players
Rotherham United F.C. players
Torquay United F.C. players
Gainsborough Trinity F.C. players
North Ferriby United A.F.C. players
Darlington F.C. players
Heidelberg United FC players
Gippsland Falcons players
English Football League players
English football managers
Expatriate soccer players in Australia